Neteller is an e-money transfer service used to transfer money to and from merchants, such as forex trading firms, social networks firms. Users in some locations can withdraw funds directly using the Net+ card or transfer the balance to their own bank accounts, others are restricted.

Neteller is owned and operated by British global payments company Paysafe Group, alongside former competitor Skrill and prepaid payment method paysafecard.

History 
Neteller was created in 1999 in Canada and moved to the Isle of Man in 2004. Paysafe Group is listed as an "Authorised Electronic Money Institution".

In 2015, Optimal Payments Plc (now Paysafe Group) finalized a transformational transaction for the global payments industry – the acquisition of Skrill Group, one of Europe’s largest online payments systems and among the world’s largest independent digital wallet providers.

Neteller is not a bank and does not lend customers' funds. It is required under FCA e-money regulations to maintain customer funds in separate trust accounts, separate from its operating cash, sufficient to repay all customer balances at the same time.

Online gambling 
Neteller began processing online gambling payments in July 2000, it was processing payments for 85% of the world's gambling merchants. 95% of the firm's revenue at that time was derived from fund transfers to online gaming firms, with many users being U.S. residents.

Accounts of U.S. users were restricted as the firm exited the United States, and funds were unrestricted after 30 July 2007. As a result of this enforced exit from the U.S. market, and the risks associated with online gambling, the firm has sought to diversify. Despite this, Neteller fee revenues fell from US$ 239 million in 2006 to about $61 million in 2010. In June, 2019 NETELLER quit the US market.

High-turnover customers are offered premium membership called "NETELLER VIP". It includes additional features and lower fees similar to premium membership of Skrill.

NETELLER VIP membership benefits also include earning cashback on transfers made using a NETELLER account, increased transfer limits and a free prepaid Mastercard for members with Silver, Gold, Platinum and Diamond VIP status.
	 
Legal issues surrounding online gambling mean that customers in a range of countries (Albania, Cambodia, Canada, Hong Kong, Israel, Laos, Lebanon, Macau, Singapore, and Turkey) are not permitted to make transfers to gambling merchants.

Product capabilities 
Consumers can sign up for a Neteller account on the company’s website. Accounts may be set up in 26 major currencies. Money can be loaded into the account from a bank, credit/debit card or via about 40 other methods. These deposit types vary by country and some are instant.

Money in a Neteller account can be used to pay merchants, sent to other customers of the service, or spent at any retailer that accepts MasterCard using the Neteller prepaid card that is a part of the account. Money can also be received into the account directly from other merchants with Neteller accounts, merchants such as gambling winnings, insurance payouts or video-gaming trading proceeds. Customers can withdraw funds from their accounts by bank transfer, cheque, or using the company’s Net+ prepaid MasterCard at point-of-sale and automated teller machines.

Net+ card

In 2003, the company launched the Neteller Card and a few years later in 2008 the card product line was later rebranded as Net+. Under the Net+ name the company offers MasterCard prepaid debit cards and merchant-brandable card programs, and formerly offered virtual cards. The Net+ virtual card generated a different virtual card number for each transaction instead of having a fixed card number, preventing some forms of fraud. If unauthorised users obtain and try to use card numbers, or if an otherwise legitimate merchant tries to take additional, unauthorised,  payments, the transaction fails as the card number cannot be re-used. In November 2016, the Net+ prepaid is only available to residents of authorized European Economic Area and other countries was cancelled without refunding the card fees.

Sponsorship
Neteller's logo was displayed on the front of the Crystal Palace Football Club according to the sponsorship deal signed by Optimal Payments PLC (now Paysafe Group) for the 2014/15 and 2015/16 seasons of the English Premier League.

References

External links
 

Financial services companies established in 1999
Digital currencies
Payment service providers
Online gambling
Electronic funds transfer
1999 establishments in Canada